Harry Potter and the Goblet of Fire (Original Motion Picture Soundtrack) was released on 15 November 2005. The film's score was composed by Patrick Doyle, conducted by James Shearman, recorded at Air Lyndhurst Studios and performed by the London Symphony Orchestra with orchestrations provided by Doyle, Shearman, Lawrence Ashmore, John Bell and James McWilliam. The score included three main new themes: one representing the Triwizard Tournament, one representing Lord Voldemort, and one representing Harry Potter's crush on Cho Chang. Doyle incorporated an ominous reprise of Hedwig's Theme into the score. A prominent minor theme is presented in "The Death of Cedric". The soundtrack entered the Billboard 200 at position eighty for the Week Ending 3 December, and also charted at four on the Top Soundtracks Chart.

Songs 22-24 are the songs playing during the Yule Ball scene when The Weird Sisters band came out and played. The Yule Ball theme ("Potter Waltz") is derived from Symphony No. 3 by Samuel Wesley.

Track listing
All tracks performed and composed by Patrick Doyle except where noted.

References

External links
 

2000s film soundtrack albums
2005 soundtrack albums
Fantasy film soundtracks
04
Patrick Doyle soundtracks